Robert Bristow (18 October 1688 –  3 November 1737) of Micheldever in Hampshire was an English politician.

His father Robert (1662–1706) and his brother John were both Members of Parliament.

Bristow himself was a director of the Bank of England from 1713 to 1716 and 1718 to 1720 and a director of the East India Company from 1716 to 1717.  He was a Member of Parliament (MP) for Winchelsea from 1708 to 1737, and was employed in the royal household as Clerk of the Green Cloth from 1720 until his death.

He married Sarah, the daughter of Sir John Ward, MP. His son Robert (1712–1776) was also an MP.

References

1688 births
1737 deaths
Members of the Parliament of Great Britain for English constituencies
People from the City of Winchester
British MPs 1708–1710
British MPs 1710–1713
British MPs 1713–1715
British MPs 1715–1722
British MPs 1722–1727
British MPs 1727–1734
British MPs 1734–1741
Directors of the British East India Company